Second Empire may refer to:

 Second British Empire, used by some historians to describe the British Empire after 1783
 Second Bulgarian Empire (1185–1396)
 Second French Empire (1852–1870)
 Second Empire architecture, an architectural style associated with the Second French Empire
 Second German Empire, sometimes used to describe the German Empire between 1871 and 1918
 Second Empire of Haiti (1849–1859)
 Second Mexican Empire (1864–1867)
 Second Persian Empire, sometimes used to describe the Parthian Empire (ca. 247 BC – 224 AD) or the Sasanian Empire 224 CE - 651 CE)
 2nd Empire Awards, film awards held in 1997

See also 
 First Empire (disambiguation)
 Third Empire (disambiguation)